Smith State Prison is a Georgia Department of Corrections state prison for men located in Glennville, Tattnall County, Georgia.

The facility opened in 1993, and has a maximum capacity of 1615 inmates held at close security level.

References

Prisons in Georgia (U.S. state)
Buildings and structures in Tattnall County, Georgia
1993 establishments in Georgia (U.S. state)